Huai Mae Thawip is a watercourse in the provinces of Kanchanaburi and Suphan Buri, Thailand. It is a tributary of Huai Krasiao, part of the Tha Chin River basin.

Mae Thawip